Clemensia inleis is a moth of the family Erebidae. It is found in Brazil.

References

Cisthenina
Moths described in 1905